Muhammad Saeed is a dental surgeon and one of the pioneers in the field of Oral and maxillofacial surgery in Pakistan. He is currently working as Principal, Bakhtawar Amin Dental College, Multan. He is the former pioneer Principal of Nishtar Institute of Dentistry, Multan, former Principal De'Montmorency College of Dentistry, Lahore and Sharif Medical and Dental College, Lahore.

Education
He graduated from De'Montmorency College of Dentistry, University of Punjab, Lahore in September 1971. He passed his statutory Examination from Royal College of Surgeons of Edinburgh in September 1976 and F.D.S.R.C.P.S. from Royal College of Physicians and Surgeons of Glasgow in June 1978.

Professional services
He served as House Surgeon, Punjab Dental Hospital, Senior House Officer, Leeds Dental Hospital, Leeds, UK, Registrar, Department of Oral & Maxillofacial Surgery, North Manchester General Hospital, Community Dental Officer, Bailie Street Health centre, Rochdale, UK, Registrar/Senior Registrar, Department of Oral Surgery, Dental Hospital, Edinburgh, Infirmary, Edinburgh and Bangour General Hospital Broxburn, UK. Then he came to Pakistan in 1983 and served first as assistant and later as associate professor, Department of Oral & Maxillofacial Surgery, de’Montmorency College of Dentistry, Lahore. Then he moved to Pakistan Institute of Medical Sciences, Islamabad in 1993 to become the Professor & Head of Department of Oral & Maxillofacial Surgery. In 1996, he moved back to De'Montmorency as Associate Professor and then became Professor & Head of OMFS, Director Post graduate students, Officer next below Principal and held Addition Charge of Principal at DMCD. He was the Dean, Faculty of Oral Surgery, College of Physicians & Surgeons Pakistan from 1996 to 2002. In 2001, he was appointed the head of Dental section, Nishtar Medical College. He retired in 2010 and now served as the Principal, University Medical and Dental College from June–August 2011, University of Lahore. Later services from 2012 to 2014 include Sharif Medical and Dental College as the dean of dental college.   
Currently he is the principal of Bakhtawar Amin Medical and Dental College, Multan.

Publications
 "Retrospective study of facial bone fractures in Lahore, Pakistan." Pakistan Journal of Medical Research: Volume 32, No. 2, April – June 1993.
 Intractable trigeminal Neuralgia, comparison of neuroectomy with Cryo surgery as a treatment option "The professional Medical Journal: vol 08 No: 2 April – June 2001.
 "An Audit of the Pathologies associated with impacted wisdom tooth". Pakistan Oral & Dental Journal Vol: 26 No.2 December – 2006
 "Efficacy of Peripheral glycerol injection in the management of Idio-pathic trigeminal Neuralgia" Pakistan Oral & Dental Journal Vol: 26(1) June- 2006.

References

Living people
Pakistani medical researchers
Pakistani dentists
People from Jhang District
1950 births